Pialea is a genus of small-headed flies. It is known from South America.

Species
 Pialea antiqua Schlinger, 1956
 Pialea brunea Schlinger in Schlinger, Gillung & Borkent, 2013
 Pialea capitella Schlinger, 1956
 Pialea corbiculata Schlinger in Schlinger, Gillung & Borkent, 2013
 Pialea ecuadorensis Schlinger, 1956
 Pialea lomata Erichson, 1840
 Pialea lutescens Westwood, 1876

References

Encyclopedia of Life entry

Acroceridae
Nemestrinoidea genera